Anna Foster (born 1979) is an English radio news reporter and presenter, she presented the drivetime programme on 5 Live Monday to Friday.

The daughter of a surveyor father (who also served as a magistrate) and a mother who worked as a nurse, she and her brother were born in South Shields. Educated in South Shields, while attending South Tyneside College doing her A-Levels, she worked as a Saturday girl on Metro Radio. She went on to study English at Collingwood College at Durham University, where she worked on student radio. She then undertook a postgraduate certificate in journalism at City University London.

On graduation she joined the BBC's trainee reporters scheme. She then joined BBC Radio Cleveland as a reporter for three years, before becoming a news presenter, and then co-presenting the drive-time show. She then joined BBC Radio 5 Live as a regional North East reporter, before relocating to London as a weekend news presenter, and also presenting on Newsbeat.

Foster joined the BBC Radio 5 Live Weekend Breakfast show on 23 April 2011, replacing Rachel Burden who moved to the weekday 5 Live Breakfast team alongside Nicky Campbell on 3 May.

On 14 November 2012, Foster became the Wednesday-to-Friday co-presenter of 5 Live Drive (4–7 pm) alongside Peter Allen; Louise Minchin was the Monday and Tuesday co-host. Foster subsequently became the permanent co-host, alongside Tony Livesey who replaced Allen in October 2014.

Foster left Drive on 12 August 2021 to take up a new role as BBC Middle East correspondent in Beirut.

She married fellow radio presenter John Foster in October 2009 at Crathorne Hall near Yarm, North Yorkshire.

References

1979 births
Living people
People from South Shields
Alumni of City, University of London
English journalists
English radio personalities
BBC Radio 5 Live presenters
Alumni of Collingwood College, Durham